NBF may refer to:
Nathan Bedford Forrest
National Bank of Fiji
National Bank of Fujairah
National Bolshevik Front
National Bonsai Foundation
National Book Festival
National Book Foundation
NetBIOS Frames
Nordic Business Forum
North Borneo Federation
Notodden Blues Festival
Norwegian Bowling Federation
 The Naxi language has ISO 639-3 code nbf